The Showaiter is an Arabic Sunni family based in the Arabian Peninsula, especially the Arab States of the Persian Gulf. In Bahrain, the family is based in Muharraq, which is one of the 33 islands in Bahrain and was the old capital city. It is popular in the Persian Gulf region, as Halwa Showaiter.

Hussain Moh'd Showaiter Sweets

See also
 Cuisine of Bahrain

References

Bahraini families
Bahraini cuisine